(Mary) Terri de la Peña (born 1947) is a Mexican American writer of novels, short stories and essays. Her works have addressed lesbian sexuality, nature, and Chicana community. De la Peña was 45 years old when her first book, Margins, was published.

Selected works 
Margins, Seal Press, 1992
Latin satins, Seal Press, 1994
Faults, Alyson Books, 1999
A is for the Americas, co-written with Cynthia Chin-Lee and Enrique O. Sanchez, Orchard Books, 1999

References 

1947 births
Living people
American writers of Mexican descent
Place of birth missing (living people)